The Pensions Act 2007 (c 22) is an Act of the Parliament of the United Kingdom. It incorporated the main findings of the all-party Pensions Commission in 2006 as set out in the white paper Security in retirement: towards a new pension system published in May 2006.

The key provisions were:
Reduction of the qualifying years for a full basic State Pension from 44 years for men and 39 years for women to 30 years for both.
Linking cost of living increases to earnings rather than prices.
changing the contribution conditions for basic State Pension so that it is easier for everyone to build up some entitlement.
replacing Home Responsibilities Protection (HRP) with a new system of weekly credits for parents and carers
Raising the pension age for women to 65 by 2020.
Raising the pension age for both women and men from 65 to 68 between 2024 and 2046.
Introducing national insurance credits for parents and carers so that they can build up some entitlement to the additional State Pension.
End of the option to contract out of the additional State Pension.

Modifications to this were made in the Pensions Act 2008.

References

External links
The Pensions Act 2007, as amended from the National Archives.
The Pensions Act 2007, as originally enacted from the National Archives.
Explanatory notes to the Pensions Act 2007.

Pensions in the United Kingdom
United Kingdom Acts of Parliament 2007